Ram Kapse (1 December 1933 – 29 September 2015) was an Indian politician who was Lt Governor of Andaman and Nicobar Islands. He was a leader of the Bharatiya Janata Party (BJP). He represented Thane from 1989 to 1996, winning the seat in 1989 and 1991. He was Chairman of Lok Sabha Committee on Food, Civil Supplies and Public Distribution during 1993–94. He was born in Nashik.

He was elected as MLA from Kalyan Vidhan Sabha constituency of Maharashtra in 1978, 1980 and 1985. He was elected to Lok Sabha from Thane in 1989 and 1991. He was also elected to Rajyasabha from Maharashtra in 1996 and was Rajya Sabha MP for the period 27 September 1996 to 4 July 1998. He is author Bharatiya Sahitya Shastra and Lentin Ayoga.

He died on 29 September 2015 in Kalyan.

References

External links 
Biographical data 10th Lok Sabha
The Hindu article

2015 deaths
1933 births
Marathi politicians
Bharatiya Janata Party politicians from Maharashtra
Lieutenant governors of the Andaman and Nicobar Islands
Rajya Sabha members from Maharashtra
India MPs 1989–1991
India MPs 1991–1996
Politicians from Thane
People from Nashik
Maharashtra MLAs 1985–1990
Lok Sabha members from Maharashtra